Michael Dempsey (September 10, 1918 – January 8, 1974) was an American Bishop of the Catholic Church. He served as an auxiliary bishop of the Archdiocese of Chicago from 1968 to 1974.

Biography
Born in Chicago, Illinois, Michael Ryan Patrick Dempsey was ordained a priest for the Archdiocese of Chicago on May 1, 1943, by Archbishop Samuel Stritch.  On June 13, 1968 Pope Paul VI appointed him as the Titular Bishop of Truentum and Auxiliary Bishop of Chicago.  He was consecrated by Cardinal John Cody on June 13, 1968. The principal co-consecrators were Bishops Ernest John Primeau of Manchester and Cletus F. O'Donnell of Madison.  He continued to serve as an auxiliary bishop until his death on January 8, 1974.

Before his appointment to the episcopacy, Father Dempsey was instrumental in creating the Catholic Campaign for Human Development.

References

1918 births
1974 deaths
Clergy from Chicago
20th-century American Roman Catholic titular bishops
Catholics from Illinois